Al-Nour Mosque is a mosque in Abbassia, Cairo, Egypt. It is among the landmarks of the neighborhood and the largest mosques in the city with several different halls for multi-purposes. It conducts social activities and sporting events as well. The mosque contains other facilities such as library.

History
The mosque was built during the presidency of Anwar Sadat on the land provided to the Salafi organization Al-Hidayatul Islamiya, led by Sheikh Hafiz Salama. Although the mosque has been under the supervision of the Ministry of Awqaf, Salama has been contesting and protesting this in order to acquire the full entitlement of the mosque.

Arab Spring
During the Arab Spring, the mosque was heavily guarded by the police in accordance with the policy of the Ministry of Interior which forbid the gathering of the demonstration in front of the major mosques and churches. However, some Salafi groups had organized the demonstration on the way to the mosque, protesting the high cost the former president Hosni Mubarak had charged to the mosque.

Architecture
The mosque was constructed by the Egyptian construction company Arab Contractors. According to their website, it has an area size of 5,000 square meters and the dome height reaches 55 meters. The mosque contains several rooms for various purposes, including rooms for the international conference, guesthouses, and medical clinics. It also hosts the center for Qur'anic memorization and workshops for arts and handicrafts.

See also
 Lists of mosques
 List of mosques in Africa
 List of mosques in Egypt
 Islam in Egypt

References

Mosques completed in the 1970s
Mosques in Cairo
Mosque buildings with domes
20th-century religious buildings and structures in Egypt